Murrihy is a surname. Notable people with the surname include:

P. J. Murrihy, Irish singer-songwriter
Paula Murrihy, Irish operatic mezzo-soprano